The Old Tolland County Jail and Museum is a historic jail in Tolland, Connecticut.  It is located at 52 Tolland Green.  The jail was in use from 1856-1968.  The Jail served as the county jail in the 19th and 20th century for criminals who were convicted of a crime or were awaiting a trial at the courthouse across the street.  The jail also had a hotel in front until a fire burned it down in 1893.  The hotel was used to provide hospitality to visitors who had jail related business.

History
The jail was built over several times. Its earliest section, made of stone and built in 1856, was in fact the fourth jail built on that site. In 1893, a brick section was added.

Management of the jail remained in the hands of the county administration until 1960, when it was transferred to the state government. The state managed it from 1960 to 1968.

Museum
The building is now owned and operated as a museum by the Tolland Historical Society.

Many of its former inmates have visited the 32-cell site of their incarceration. They are found telling tales to visitors about their days in the "Hollyhock Hotel", which was what the inmates called the jail.

References

External links
 Old Tolland County Jail and Museum - Tolland Historical Society

Tolland, Connecticut
Museums in Tolland County, Connecticut
Prison museums in Connecticut
Historic district contributing properties in Connecticut
National Register of Historic Places in Tolland County, Connecticut
1856 establishments in Connecticut
Government buildings completed in 1856